Borup is a city in Norman County, Minnesota, United States. The population was 96 at the 2020 census.

History
The city was named for Charles William Wulff Borup, a Minnesota banker. A post office called Borup has been in operation since 1896.

Geography

Minnesota State Highway 9 serves as a main route in the community.

Demographics

2010 census
As of the census of 2010, there were 110 people, 37 households, and 27 families living in the city. The racial makeup of the city was 97.3% White, 1.8% Native American, and 0.9% from two or more races. Hispanic or Latino of any race were 5.5% of the population.

There were 37 households, of which 40.5% had children under the age of 18 living with them, 62.2% were married couples living together, 10.8% had a female householder with no husband present, and 27.0% were non-families. 21.6% of all households were made up of individuals, and 8.1% had someone living alone who was 65 years of age or older. The average household size was 2.97 and the average family size was 3.63.

The median age in the city was 28.8 years. 37.3% of residents were under the age of 18; 7.2% were between the ages of 18 and 24; 20.9% were from 25 to 44; 21.8% were from 45 to 64; and 12.7% were 65 years of age or older. The gender makeup of the city was 52.7% male and 47.3% female.

2000 census
As of the census of 2000, there were 91 people, 38 households, and 22 families living in the city. The racial makeup of the city was 86.81% White, 2.20% Native American, 2.20% Asian, and 8.79% from two or more races.

There were 38 households, out of which 28.9% had children under the age of 18 living with them, 57.9% were married couples living together, 2.6% had a female householder with no husband present, and 39.5% were non-families. 39.5% of all households were made up of individuals, and 10.5% had someone living alone who was 65 years of age or older. The average household size was 2.39 and the average family size was 3.26.

In the city, the population was spread out, with 27.5% under the age of 18, 9.9% from 18 to 24, 26.4% from 25 to 44, 20.9% from 45 to 64, and 15.4% who were 65 years of age or older. The median age was 36 years. For every 100 females, there were 116.7 males. For every 100 females age 18 and over, there were 135.7 males.

The median income for a household in the city was $41,042, and the median income for a family was $41,875. Males had a median income of $32,083 versus $22,083 for females. The per capita income for the city was $17,081. None of the population or the families were below the poverty line.

References

Cities in Minnesota
Cities in Norman County, Minnesota